Contortion Spur is the largest and easternmost of three spurs which descend northwards from Mount Madison near the mouth of Byrd Glacier in Antarctica. The spur exposes a spectacular syncline of white marble and black schist. It was geologically mapped on December 10, 2000, by Edmund Stump of the United States Antarctic Program; he suggested the name because of the skewed form of the spur.

References
 

Ridges of the Ross Dependency
Shackleton Coast